Global Communication is an electronic music act, consisting of Tom Middleton and Mark Pritchard.

Biography
Global Communication's first LP, 76:14, is an acclaimed album from the ambient and 1990s electronic music genres. Beyond their work as Global Communication, they have also recorded as Jedi Knights, Secret Ingredients, The Chameleon, Link & E621,  and Reload; have done remixes for various artists under each of their aliases, including a 1993 Reload remix of "On" by Aphex Twin and a 1997 Jedi Knights remix of "Home" by Depeche Mode. Their song 5:23 from their album 76:14 features on the Grand Theft Auto 4 radio station The Journey. They founded the Evolution Records and Universal Language Productions labels.

Discography
Original work as Global Communication
Keongaku EP (1992)
Pentamerous Metamorphosis (1993)
76:14 (1994)
Maiden Voyage (2xEP) (1994)
Remotion: The Global Communication Remix Album (1995)
The Way/The Deep EP (1996)
The Groove EP (1997)
Pentamerous Metamorphosis (Remastered) (1998)
76:14 10-Year Anniversary Remastered Re-Release (2xCD) (2005)
Transmissions Boxset (Pentamerous Metamorphosis, 76:14, Singles/Remixes/Unreleased Bonus Tracks, 3xCD/7xLP All Remastered) (2020)

Mixes as Global Communication
Fabric 26 (DJ Mix 1/2 by Mark Pritchard, 1/2 by Tom Middleton) (2006)
Back In The Box (2xCD DJ Mix) (2011)

As Reload (at first, a Pritchard solo project, later including Middleton)
Reload EP (1992) – (Remaster/Reissue 2006)
Auto-Reload EP (1992) – (Remaster/Reissue 2006)
Amenity EP/Cyberdon EP (Reload Remixes) (1993) – (Cyberdon Remaster/Reissue: 2007)
A Collection of Short Stories (1993)
Archives EP (1997)

As Reload & E621
Auto-Reload EP (1992)
Auto-Reload EP Vol. 2 (1993)
The Biosphere EP (1993)
Evolution Remaster/Reissue of Reload EP, Auto-Reload EP and The Biosphere EP (3x12") (2006)

As Link (Pritchard Solo)
The First Link EP (1992) – (Remaster/Reissue: 2007)
The Augur EP (1993) – (Remaster/Reissue: 2007)

As Link & E621
Antacid EP (1995)

As The Chameleon
Links EP (1995)

As Secret Ingredients
New York New York (1996)
Chicago Chicago (1996)

As Jedi Knights
May The Funk Be With You EP (1995)
New School Science (1996)
The Big Ones EP (1997)
Return of the Jedis (Promo) (1999)
Jedi Selector (2000)

Evolution Records Compilation
The Theory of Evolution (1995)

Remixes
As Global Communication
 Mystic Institute: "Ob-Selon Mi-Nos (Repainted By Global Communication" (1993)
 Reload & E621: "The Biosphere (Global Communication Remix)" (1993)
 Link: "Arcadian (Global Communication Remix)" (1994)
 Warp 69: "Natural High (Global Communication Re-Take)" (1994)
 Nav Katze: "Wild Horse (Global Mix Communication)" (1994)
 The Grid: "Rollercoaster (The Global Communication Yellow Submarine Re-Take)" (1994)
 Palmskin Productions: "Evolution of The Beast (Part 2) (Global Communication Mix)" (1994)
 Soft Ballet: "Ride (Global Communication Dub Mix)" (1995)
 Jon Anderson: "Bless This (Global Communication Mix)" (1995)
 Jon Anderson: "Amor Real (Global Communication Mix)" (1995)
 Azymuth: "Jazz Carnival (Global Communication's Space Jazz Mix)" (1996)
 PJ Harvey & John Parish: "Civil War Correspondent (Global Communication Mix)" (1996)
 Sensorama: "Aspirin (Global Communication Remix)" (1996)
 Lamb: "Gorecki (Global Communication Mix)" (1997)
 Dusky: "Skin Deep (Global Communication Remix & Global Communication Dub)" (2015)

As Reload
 Mystic Institute: "QA-752L-P (Reload Remix)" (1993)
 Mystic Institute: "NS-581A-T (Reload Remix)" (1993)
 Slowdive: "In Mind (The Reload 147 Take)" (1993)
 Aphex Twin: "On (Reload Remix)" (1993)
 Nav Katze: "Crazy Dream (The Reload Retro 313 Future Memory Mix)" (1994)
 Confusion: "Drawing (Sound Sculpture by Reload)" (1994)
 Schaft: "Visual Cortex (The Reload Re-difinition)" (1994)

As Jedi Knights
 Link & E621: "Antacid (Jedi Knights Remix)" (1995)
 Bomb the Bass: "Absorber (Jedi Knights Remixes 1 & 2)" (1995)
 Model 500: "The Flow (Jedi Knights Remix)" (1995)
 Nicolette: "We Never Know (Jedi Knights Remix)" (1995) (unreleased)
 Depeche Mode: "Home (Jedi Knights Remix)" (1997)
 Leftfield: "Afrika Shox (Jedis Elastic Bass Remix)" (1999)
 Underworld: "Jumbo (Jedis Electro Dub & Sugar Hit Remix)" (1999)

As The Chameleon
 Palmskin Productions: "Evolution of The Beast (Part 1) (The Chameleon Remix)" (1994)
 Link: "Amazon Amenity (The Chameleon Remix)" (1995)

As Secret Ingredients
 Global Communication: "The Way (Secret Ingredients Remix)" (1996)
 The Jedis: "Disco Magic (Secret Ingredients Remix)" (1999)

As Link & E621
 Global Communication: "7:39 (Link & E621 Appliance of Science Mix)" (1994)

See also 
List of ambient music artists

References

External links
Reload official website

Interview with Middleton and Pritchard on the history of Global Communication 
Evolution Records Shop

British ambient music groups
English house music duos
Remixers
Deep house musicians
Dedicated Records artists